Millen Matende (born 23 September 1982) is a Zimbabwean long distance runner. He competed in the men's marathon at the 2017 World Championships in Athletics.

References

External links

1982 births
Living people
Zimbabwean male long-distance runners
Zimbabwean male marathon runners
World Athletics Championships athletes for Zimbabwe
Place of birth missing (living people)